iTunes Live from Montreal may refer to:

 iTunes Live from Montreal (Joseph Arthur album), 2009
 iTunes Live from Montreal (Good Charlotte album), 2009
 iTunes Live from Montreal (Simple Plan EP), a 2009 EP by Simple Plan